Kaghartsi is a village de facto in the Martuni Province of the breakaway Republic of Artsakh, de jure in the Khojavend District of Azerbaijan, in the disputed region of Nagorno-Karabakh. The village has an ethnic Armenian-majority population, and also had an Armenian majority in 1989.

History 
During the Soviet period, the village was a part of the Martuni District of the Nagorno-Karabakh Autonomous Oblast.

Historical heritage sites 
Historical heritage sites in and around the village include a 13th-century khachkar, the 17th/18th-century chapel of Lusavorich, an 18th/19th-century cemetery, a 19th-century spring monument, and the 19th-century monastery church of Targmanchats.

Economy and culture 
The population is mainly engaged in agriculture and animal husbandry. As of 2015, the village has a municipal building, a house of culture, a secondary school, and a medical centre.

Demographics 
The village had 337 inhabitants in 2005, and 306 inhabitants in 2015.

References

External links 
 

Populated places in Martuni Province
Populated places in Khojavend District